Maria Mandl (also spelled Mandel; 10 January 1912 – 24 January 1948) was an Austrian SS-Helferin ("SS helper") known for her role in the Holocaust as a top-ranking official at the Auschwitz-Birkenau extermination camp, where she is believed to have been directly complicit in the deaths of over 500,000 prisoners. She was executed for war crimes.

Life
Mandl was born in Münzkirchen, Upper Austria, then part of Austria-Hungary, the daughter of a shoemaker.

Camp work
After the Anschluss by Nazi Germany, Mandl moved to Munich, and on 15 October 1938 joined the camp staff at Lichtenburg, an early Nazi concentration camp in the Province of Saxony, as an Aufseherin, and worked with fifty other SS women. On 15 May 1939, along with other guards and prisoners, Mandl was sent to the newly opened Ravensbrück concentration camp near Berlin. She soon impressed her superiors and, after she had joined the Nazi Party on 1 April 1941, was elevated to the rank of a SS-Oberaufseherin in April 1942. She oversaw daily roll calls, assignments for Aufseherinnen and punishments such as beatings and floggings.

On 7 October 1942, Mandl was assigned to Auschwitz II-Birkenau, succeeding Johanna Langefeld as SS-Lagerführerin of the women camp under SS-Kommandant Rudolf Höß. As a woman she could never outrank a male, but her control over both female prisoners and her female subordinates was absolute. The only man Mandl reported to was the commandant. She controlled all the female Auschwitz camps and female subcamps including at Hindenburg, Lichtewerden and Raisko.

Mandl promoted Irma Grese to head of the Hungarian women's camp at Birkenau. According to some accounts, Mandl often stood at the gate into Birkenau waiting for an inmate to turn and look at her: any who did were taken out of the lines and never heard from again. At Auschwitz, Mandl was known as The Beast, and for the next two years she participated in selections for death and other documented abuses. She signed inmate lists, sending an estimated half a million women and children to their deaths in the gas chambers at Auschwitz I and II.

Mandl created the Women's Orchestra of Auschwitz to accompany roll calls, executions, selections and transports. An Auschwitz prisoner, Lucia Adelsberger, later described it in her book, Auschwitz: Ein Tatsachenbericht:The women who came back from work exhausted had to march in time to the music. Music was ordered for all occasions, for the addresses of the Camp Commanders, for the transports and whenever anybody was hanged.

For her services, Mandl was awarded the War Merit Cross 2nd class. In November 1944, she was assigned to the Mühldorf subcamp of Dachau concentration camp and Elisabeth Volkenrath became head of Auschwitz, which were liberated in late January 1945. In May 1945, Mandl fled from Mühldorf into the mountains of southern Bavaria to her birthplace, Münzkirchen.

Firsthand account of Mandl's treatment of prisoners 
The following is a firsthand account of Mandl's treatment of prisoners upon arrival to Auschwitz, provided by Jewish Prisoner Sala Feder on December 1, 1947 to the District Court in Kraków.In August 1943 I was deported together with my family (27 people, including nine children aged from one month to eleven years) from the ghetto in Środula near Sosnowiec to Auschwitz, in a transport numbering some 5,000 people.

At the ramp in Birknau, the transport was awaited by the defendant Mandl accompanied by SS woman Margot Dreschel, and as soon as the transport had arrived, Mandl carried out a selection, sending approximately 90 percent of the transport to the cars which transported these people to the nearby crematorium.

[...] During these selections, defendant Mandl tortured the prisoners in a cruel way, beating the women, the men and the children with a whip and kicking them blindly. She would tear the children from the arms of their mothers, and when the mothers tried to come near the children and defend them, Mandl would beat the mothers horribly and kick them. I saw – right next to me – a young, 20-year-old mother, who tried to go near her two-year-old child thrown onto the car, and Mandl kicked and beat her so cruelly that she didn't get up any more.

[...] I held my four-year-old child by the hand. The defendant Mandl approached me, tore my child away from me and threw the child onto a still empty car so that the child got wounded in the face and began to cry and call me, but I was put aside to the group that wasn't loaded onto the cars. When I tried to reach the child, crying on the car, Mandl began to beat me so cruelly that I fell. Mandl continued to kick me although I was lying on the ground, and she knocked out almost all of my teeth with her shoe.

Sala Feder's account continues with a description of Margot Dreschel's mass torture of women involving the infamous Block 25 in Auschwitz:In my block [Block 15], 700 women were chosen out of 1,000; in the whole camp (that is, in lager A, where we stayed in the so-called quarantine), Mandl selected several thousand women, and all of them – naked – were crammed into one block no. 25, where they stayed for seven days and nights without food or water. On the night of 27 September, they were transported to the crematorium.

For the period of these seven days, we heard horrible screams and groans issuing from that block, and when the women were taken to the crematorium, the block elder, a Slovakian woman named Cyla (who had already been tried in Czechoslovakia), told us that after those seven days there were more corpses than living people in that block, and that almost all of them had bitten fingers and breasts and plucked out eyes.

During these seven days, if any prisoner wanted to carry water or some food to that block, she was arrested there and perished along with the rest. The above-described selection was carried by the defendant Mandl in person, with the help from kapos: Stenia, Leo and Maria, all of them cruel and used to torturing the prisoners in a horrible manner.

Arrest and execution
After the war, Mandl fled to her native Münzkirchen. After her father refused to help her hide, Mandl sought her sister for refuge. However, Mandl was arrested by the United States Army on 10 August 1945. Interrogations reportedly revealed her to be highly intelligent and dedicated to her work in the camps. For some time, Mandl was held in a cell in the former Dachau camp. She was filmed by U.S. soldiers in May 1946 sharing a cell with Elizabeth Ruppert. Upon their request, U.S. officials transferred Mandl to Polish custody in November 1946. In November 1947, Mandl was tried by the Supreme National Tribunal in the Auschwitz trial, found guilty of crimes against humanity, and sentenced to death by hanging.

Stanisława Rachwałowa (a Polish survivor of Auschwitz who was an inmate under Mandl's administration and, after the war, was arrested by Poland's post-war communist authorities as an "anti-communist activist") was imprisoned in the cell next to Maria Mandl and Therese Brandl. Rachwałowa was proficient enough in German to interpret for the wardens. She stated that the last time she and the two German war criminals met – after they had been sentenced to death and shortly before their executions took place – both had asked her for forgiveness. Mandl was hanged on 24 January 1948.

See also
 Female guards in Nazi concentration camps
 Irma Grese
 Ilse Koch

References

Other sources
 Brown, D.P.: The Camp Women: The Female Auxiliaries Who Assisted the SS in Running the Nazi Concentration Camp System; Schiffer Publishing 2002; .

1912 births
1948 deaths
People from Schärding District
Austrian female criminals
Auschwitz trial executions
Austrian people executed abroad
Dachau concentration camp personnel
Prisoners and detainees of the United States military
People extradited to Poland
Holocaust perpetrators in Poland
Executed Austrian women
Ravensbrück concentration camp personnel
Auschwitz concentration camp personnel
Executed Austrian Nazis
Austrian people convicted of crimes against humanity
Female guards in Nazi concentration camps
Executed mass murderers